Tide is an Irish/Scottish/Welsh documentary TV series about the tide, the seas and human action on both.

Filmed in Ireland, Great Britain, China, Norway, the Netherlands and Canada, it is a coproduction by TG4 (Ireland; Irish), BBC Alba (Scotland; Scottish Gaelic), BBC Northern Ireland, S4C (Wales; Welsh) and the Chinese broadcaster LIC.

The series was pitched at the 2017 Celtic Media Festival and was part of the 2019 International Year of Indigenous Languages. It was created with a £600,000 STG budget.

Episodes
These broadcast dates are for TG4 and BBC Alba, the first stations to air the documentaries.

References

External links 
 

Irish-language television shows
Welsh-language television shows
TG4 original programming
2019 British television series debuts
2019 British television series endings
2010s Welsh television series
S4C original programming
2019 Irish television series debuts
2019 Irish television series endings
Irish documentary television series
2010s British documentary television series
Nature educational television series
BBC Alba shows